Colias viluiensis, is a butterfly in the family Pieridae. It is found in Transbaikalia.

Description
Pale orange-yellow, with rather narrow distal margin, light-centred middle spot on the forewing and very large, reddish-brown-edged middle spot on the hindwing. Underside pale yellow; hindwing dusted with greenish, the distal margins being pale blackish, the middle spot of the forewing having a light-coloured centre and the large white middle spot of the hindwing being double and edged with black; female red or white, hindwing sometimes almost black.

Subspecies
C. v. viluiensis
C. v. dahurica Austaut, 1899
C. v. heliophora Churkin & Grieshuber, 2001 Chukotka

Taxonomy
Treated as a subspecies of Colias hecla by Josef Grieshuber & Gerardo Lamas, who point out that the spelling viluensis was used by Ménétriés in his earliest published description.

References

External links
State Darwin Museum Darwin Museum type specimen images of Colias viluiensis heliophora Churkin et Grieshuber, 2001
Rusinsects

viluiensis
Butterflies described in 1859